Liberty Hill Independent School District is a 5A public school district based in Liberty Hill, Texas, United States. Their mascot is a panther.

In 2009, the school district was rated "recognized" by the Texas Education Agency.

Schools
Liberty Hill High School (Grades 9-12)
Liberty Hill Middle School (Grades 6-8)
Santa Rita Middle School (Grades 6-8)
Noble Elementary School (Grades PK-5)
Burden Elementary School (Grades PK-5)
Liberty Hill Elementary School (Grades PK-5)
Rancho Sienna Elementary School (Grades PK-5)
Santa Rita Elementary School (Grades PK-5)

References

External links
Liberty Hill ISD

School districts in Williamson County, Texas